Ron Hoggarth (born April 12, 1948 in Barrie, Ontario) is a Canadian retired National Hockey League referee. His career started in 1971 and ended in 1994. He officiated in 1,190 regular season games, 150 Stanley Cup playoff games and three All-Star games. In a game that Hoggarth officiated on January 26, 1992, he charged Kevin Stevens, Jaromir Jagr and Mario Lemieux with Game Misconduct Penalties and threw all out of the game with less than 1 minute remaining, resulting in Lemieux calling the NHL a "Garage League".

References

1948 births
Living people
Canadian ice hockey officials
Ice hockey people from Simcoe County
National Hockey League officials
Sportspeople from Barrie